The following is the final results of the 1991 Asian Wrestling Championships.

Medal table

Team ranking

Medal summary

Men's freestyle

Men's Greco-Roman

References

External links 
UWW Database

Asia
Asian Wrestling Championships
International wrestling competitions hosted by Iran
International wrestling competitions hosted by India
W
W